Cathedral of Santa Ana may refer to:

 Cathedral of Santa Ana (Canary Islands)
 Cathedral of Santa Ana (El Salvador)